Aristida vagans, the threeawn speargrass, is a species of grass native to Australia. The specific epithet vagans is from Latin, meaning "wanderer". The plant was first collected by botanists in Sydney, and published in 1799 by the Spanish taxonomist Antonio José Cavanilles.

References

vagans
Flora of New South Wales
Flora of Queensland
Plants described in 1799
Taxa named by Antonio José Cavanilles